Ishnophanes bifucata is a moth of the family Coleophoridae. It is found in Iran, Turkmenistan, Tajikistan and Yemen.

References

Coleophoridae
Moths of the Middle East
Moths of the Arabian Peninsula
Insects of Central Asia
Moths described in 1994